The Czech Footballer of the Year is awarded in the Czech Republic by the Football Association of the Czech Republic (FA ČR). Eligibility extends to Czech players in the Czech Republic and abroad. Awards for young player, coach and Czech First League personality of the year are also awarded. The award was first presented in 1965, as an award for the whole of Czechoslovakia. It was won by Ján Popluhár.

Petr Čech won the award for an unprecedented sixth time in the 2012 ceremony, passing the previous record of five wins held by fellow goalkeeper Ivo Viktor. Viktor had previously won the award more times than any other player, having won the award five times in the Czechoslovak era between 1968 and 1976.

The other football award in the Czech Republic is the Golden Ball, awarded by sport journalists.

Winners

The award has been made every year since the first award in 1965. In 1996 two players shared the award.

Other awards

References

External links 
  Historie ankety Fotbalista roku at ČMFS website

Football in the Czech Republic
Association football player of the year awards by nationality
Czech sports trophies and awards
1965 establishments in Czechoslovakia
Awards established in 1965
Annual events in the Czech Republic